The Jagdishpur estate was a zamindari estate situated in modern-day Bihar, India, in erstwhile Shahabad district (now in Arrah). The centre of the estate was the town of Jagdishpur, however the estate also included neighbouring towns and villages. The estate was also protected by a fort.

History
The Jagdishpur estate was ruled by a branch of the Ujjainiya Rajputs. These Ujjainiyas claimed descent from the Paramara dynasty of Malwa and the Bhojpur region of Bihar was named after the Paramara King, Raja Bhoj.
Sujan Sahi who was the son of Prabal Sahi Singh, was the first to take up residence in Jagdishpur in 1702. After being killed by the retainers of the Governors of Bihar, he was succeeded by his son Udwant Singh who was said to be well-trained in the use of weapons and an able administrator. Udwant Singh expanded his territories by invading neighbouring towns and villages controlled by neighbouring landowners. Upon hearing this, the governor of Bihar, Fakkhradaula invaded Jagdishpur but Udwant Singh defeated him. Udwant Singh also encouraged the Ujjainiyas to eat pork to prevent them converting to Islam. In his court, he patronised the poet, Mauli Kavi, who compiled the book Udwant Prakash in 1747.

Under the leadership of Dalpat Shahi in the 18th century, Jagdishpur became the principal military stronghold of the Ujjainiya clan. Mughal sources from the time note that the cavalry was the elite section of the Jagdishpur army and was considered to be superior to the infantry.

1857 rebellion

During the rule of Kunwar Singh, the estate took part in the Indian Rebellion of 1857. Kunwar Singh was motivated to rebel after having financial difficulties due to the high revenue demanded by the British authorities and family litigation. The British also attempted to take over the management of the estate.

As a result of this, Kunwar Singh (who was 80 at the time) decided to join the rebellion and was considered to be the leader of the rebellion in Bihar. He was helped by his brother, Babu Amar Singh and his commander-in-chief, Hare Krishna Singh. After some initial success, Kunwar Singh and his forces were eventually driven out of Jagdishpur by the British. A year later, Kunwar Singh died and the rebellion was led by his brother who was eventually captured and hanged. Because of these events, many consider Kunwar Singh to be one of the "greatest chiefs" of Jagdishpur.

Rulers
From 1702 to 1947, the Jagdishpur estate was ruled by the following individuals

Sujan Shahi
Udwant Singh
Gajraj Singh
Dalpat Shahi
Shivraj Singh
Bhoop Naryan Singh
Ishwari Prasad Singh
Shahabzada Singh
Kunwar Singh
Babu Amar Singh
Shriniwas Singh
Digvijay Singh (acceded to Indian Union in 1947)

See also
Zamindars of Bihar

References 

Zamindari estates
History of Bihar
Kingdoms of Bihar
Rajput estates
Rajputs